The Unknown is a 1946 American mystery film directed by Henry Levin made by Columbia Pictures as the third and final part of its I Love a Mystery series based on the popular radio program. The previous films were I Love a Mystery (1945) and The Devil's Mask (1946).

It was a loose adaptation of the I Love a Mystery radio episode Faith, Hope, and Charity, Sisters, which was remade in a later version of the radio series, in '49, as The Thing That Cries in the Night, starring Russell Thorson, Jim Boles, and Tony Randall as the private detectives, and Mercedes MacCambridge as the stewardess and Cherry (Charity).

It was known as The Coffin.

Cast

Critical reception
TV Guide gave the film two out of five stars, describing it as "filled with all the things that are guaranteed to make audiences jump out of their seats, such as hidden passageways, a hooded grave robber, eerie shadows, and mysterious killings".

References

External links
 

American mystery films
1946 films
American black-and-white films
Columbia Pictures films
Films directed by Henry Levin
1946 mystery films
1940s English-language films
1940s American films